Chryseobacterium aahli  is a Gram-negative bacteria from the genus of Chryseobacterium which has been isolated from the kidney of the lake trout Salvelinus namaycush.

References

Further reading 
 

aahli
Bacteria described in 2014